Gorgadze is a Georgian surname. Notable people with the surname include:
Beka Gorgadze (bornl 1996), Georgian rugby union player
Lana Gorgadze (born 1997), Georgian footballer
Levan Gorgadze (born 1987), Georgian professional sumo wrestler 

Surnames of Georgian origin
Georgian-language surnames